Kondor may refer to:

Places 
 Iran
Kondor, Alborz
Kondor, Chaharmahal and Bakhtiari
Kondor, East Azerbaijan
Kondor, Hamadan
Kondor, Kerman
Kondor, Lorestan
Kondor, Qazvin
Kondor, Razavi Khorasan
Kondor, Birjand, South Khorasan
Kondor, Nehbandan, South Khorasan
Kondor, West Azerbaijan

Other uses 
Kondor (automobile), a German automobile
Kondor (satellite), a series of Russian spacecraft
Kondor D.6, a German biplane
Kondor D.7, a German biplane

See also
Kandar (disambiguation)
Kandor (disambiguation)
Kondar (disambiguation)
Condor (disambiguation)